The Hon. Albert J. Isola TEP is a Gibraltarian barrister and politician, member of the Gibraltar Socialist Labour Party (GSLP). He was a member of the Gibraltar House of Assembly as part of the Opposition between 1996 and 2000. He later became a Government Minister for Financial Services and Gaming after becoming elected to Parliament in the 2013 by-election. Isola is married and has four children.

Biography 
Albert Isola comes from a traditional family of lawyers, with businesses in Gibraltar since 1892. He studied at Stonyhurst College, Lancashire, between 1973 and 1980 and studied law at Kingston University (1980–1983), before being admitted to the Bar for England and Gibraltar in 1985.

Isola supported the GSLP since 1986, and was elected to the House of Assembly in 1996. He remained a Member of Parliament until 2000. In 2000, he left politics to devote himself to his family and business. After the death of Charles Bruzon, he ran for Member of Parliament in a parliamentary by-election.

Isola was elected with 4,899 votes (50%) and nominated as Minister for Financial Services and Gaming by the Chief Minister, Fabian Picardo.

References

External links 
 Albert Isola – Personal blog
 GBC Poll places Isola narrowly ahead of Nahon
 Isola becomes Minister for Financial Services and Gaming

Alumni of Kingston University
Gibraltar Socialist Labour Party politicians
Government ministers of Gibraltar
Gibraltarian barristers
Living people
People educated at Stonyhurst College
Year of birth missing (living people)
20th-century Gibraltarian lawyers
21st-century Gibraltarian lawyers